The 2015–16 Central Michigan Chippewas men's basketball team represented Central Michigan University during the 2015–16 NCAA Division I men's basketball season. The Chippewas, led by fourth year head coach Keno Davis, played their home games at McGuirk Arena as members of the West Division of the Mid-American Conference. They finished the season 17–16, 10–8 in MAC play to finish in a tie for the West Division championship. They lost in the quarterfinals of the MAC tournament to Bowling Green. They were invited to the CollegeInsider.com Tournament where they lost in the first round to Tennessee–Martin.

Previous season
The Chippewas finished the season 23–9, 12–6 in MAC play to be champions of the West Division and share the overall MAC regular season championship with Buffalo. They advanced to the championship game of the MAC tournament where they lost to Buffalo. As a conference champion, and #1 seed in their conference tournament, who failed to win their conference tournament they received an automatic bid to the National Invitation Tournament where they lost in the first round to Louisiana Tech.

Departures

Recruiting class of 2015

Recruiting class of 2016

Roster

Schedule and results
Source: 

|-
!colspan=9 style="background:#660033; color:#FFCC00;"| Exhibition

|-
!colspan=9 style="background:#660033; color:#FFCC00;"| Non-conference games

|-
!colspan=9 style="background:#660033; color:#FFCC00;"| Mid-American Conference games

|-
!colspan=9 style="background:#660033; color:#FFCC00;"| MAC tournament

|-
!colspan=9 style="background:#660033; color:#FFCC00;"| CIT

References

Central Michigan
Central Michigan Chippewas men's basketball seasons
Central Michigan